Goulard is a surname. Notable people with the surname include:

Antoine Goulard (born 1985), French football player
François Goulard (born 1953), French politician
Marc-Antoine Goulard (born 1964), French painter
Sylvie Goulard (born 1964), French politician
Thomas Goulard (1697–1784), French surgeon